Shkolny is a rural locality (a settlement) in Yesiplevskoye Rural Settlement, Kolchuginsky District, Vladimir Oblast, Russia. The population was 4 as of 2010.

Geography 
Shkolny is located on the Ilmovka River, 16 km east of Kolchugino (the district's administrative centre) by road. Sloboda is the nearest rural locality.

References 

Rural localities in Kolchuginsky District